2nd Infantry Regiment later known as the 2nd Infantry Regiment of the Lithuanian Grand Duke Algirdas was a Lithuanian Army infantry regiment that saw combat in the Lithuanian Wars of Independence. It existed from 1918 to 1940. The current Lithuanian arm's Grand Duke Algirdas Mechanised Infantry Battalion continues the 2nd Regiment's traditions.

Formation 
The regiment began forming on 5 December 1918. However, the Red Army was approaching from the east, so the core of the regiment, composed of the pulkininkas Vincas Grigaliūnas-Glovackis, three officers, and two soldiers, transferred from Vilnius to Kaunas and established itself in three rooms of the hotel "Europa". The German Army, still present in Lithuania, hindered the formation of the regiment, but the regiment was still granted the barracks in the Upper Panemunė. The regiment's officers travelled through Suvalkija and recruited volunteers. In early February 1919, the regiment had 50 officers and 1,262 soldiers, but there was only 420 rifles and no machine-gun. There was no military clothing, the volunteers received only a uniform cap, but still wore civilian clothes and were fed poorly. 

The training of volunteers was short and were quickly pressed into action, as the Bolsheviks was already threatening the temporary capital, Kaunas.

Lithuanian Wars of Independence

Lithuanian-Soviet War 
The Soviet forces were approaching Kaunas from Prienai, thus 200 of the 2nd regiment's soldiers were sent to the front and fought in the battle of Jieznas. The first fights were unsuccessful due to the lack of force and experience. During the fight, one officer of the regiment, Cietuchin betrayed the regiment and led a squad of 33 men directly to enemy. The fight resulted in heavy casualties: 18 dead and 33 captured. Nevertheless, after a few days and after receiving reinforcements, the infantry took Jieznas back and halted the southern force of the Bolshevik offensive's pincer movement.

From May to September 1919, the regiment was part of the Panevėžys Group which fought the Red Army near Žasliai, Kėdainiai, Ramygala, Obeliai. In these fights, the regiment had 3 battalions with 63 officers, nearly 2,000 men and 20 machine guns.

The Battle of Panevėžys was very fierce and had to be liberated twice - on 19 and 21 May. Especially fierce fights raged in Kupiškis. The regiment's fights in Latvia were hard, due to an inconsistent supply and a dropping morale. Nonetheless, when the fights ended in September, the Bolsheviks were driven out of Lithuania.

Polish-Lithuanian War 
In 1920 the regiment unsuccessfully fought against invading Polish forces near Seinai and Giedraičiai.

During the totality of the Lithuanian Wars of Independence, 11 officers and 111 men fell on the battlefield.

Interwar 
The regiment garrisoned Šančiai (an eldership in Kaunas) and Jonava. In 1926 July, the regiment was awarded 2nd class of the Order of Vytautas Cross with the inscription "Tėvynės meilė tebus mums vadovas" (English: Love of the Fatherland will be our guide).

Soviet Occupation 
When the USSR occupied Lithuania, the regiment's name was removed on 25 July 1940. When the Lithuanian People's Army into the Red Army, the regiment was disbanded.

Regiment's commanders 

 Pranas Liatukas
 Vincas Grigaliūnas-Glovackis
 1920 March 17 - Jonas Laurinaitis
 1922 September 20 - Jonas Petraitis
 1927-1928 Bronius Ivanauskas
 1928-1934 Julius Čaplikas
 1934 Juozas Tumas
 Antanas Špokevičius

Officers 
Petras Ciunis – Commander of the 2nd Company in 1939-1940.

References

See also 

 http://www.archyvai.lt/lt/fondai/kariuomene/lcva_f514.html
 

Military units and formations established in 1918
Military units and formations disestablished in 1940
Infantry regiments of Lithuania